Spadefoot  may refer to the following toads:
 Scaphiopodidae, a family, the American spadefoot toads
 Megophrys edwardinae, Edwardina's spadefoot toad, a species of southeast Asia
 Notaden, a genus, the Australian spadefoot toads
 Pelobatidae, a family with one extant genus, Pelobates, the European spadefoot toads

Animal common name disambiguation pages